Ernest Herbert Bodell (17 August 1928 – 16 October 2003) was an Irish cricketer. He was a right-handed batsman and right-arm fast-medium bowler.

He made his debut for Ireland in a first-class match against the MCC in September 1954. He went on to play for Ireland on six occasions; four further first-class matches against Scotland, the last of which came in June 1959, and a non-first-class match against the MCC at Lord's in August 1957.

As a managing director of Guinness he was at the forefront of business in Ireland ranging from his involvement with Guinness and Murphy's, to the fishing community.

Bodell was married to "Mo" and was father to three daughters, Jane, Olga, and Phillipa, and later a grandfather to eleven children.

References
CricketEurope Stats Zone profile

Bodell,Ernest
Bodell,Ernest
Bodell,Ernest
Cricketers from Dublin (city)